Alexandra Rozenman is a contemporary Russian-American painter, graphic designer, and book illustrator. She is recognized for her works where visual artifacts are used as the means for telling intricate, idiosyncratic, compelling stories. Her work has been on exhibit in the leading museums, including the National Centre for Contemporary Arts in her native Moscow, and deCordova Museum in Lincoln, Massachusetts. Rozenman lives in Boston and works in Somerville, Massachusetts.

Early life and education

Rozenman was born in Moscow, Russia (then Soviet Union).  Her early influences included an art school for gifted child artists at the Pushkin Museum - at that time the only venue for Western art shows in Moscow, both ancient and modern.  Nina N. Kofman, an art educator, ran an art school for very young children at the museum, actively using its collection as a study aide.  Several of Rozenman's works from that period have been shown at the international shows of children's art  (in Russia, Japan, India, and Finland, among others).  Later on, Rozenman studied with several dissident artists who went on to become famous in the West, including Grisha Bruskin.  When Rozenman's family emigrated from Russia to the US in 1989, she continued her art education there, participating in the Studio Semester in New York Program at SUNY Empire State College (she graduated in 1995), and proceeding to Boston, where she earned her MFA from the School of Museum of Fine Arts at Tufts University in 1997.

Career 

Rozenman worked in many places in the US, including the East Coast (Washington, New York City, and Boston), West Coast (Los Angeles), and Mid-West (East Lansing, Michigan, and Saint Paul, Minnesota), striving to capture her life experience, and developing a unique, highly personal way of expressing the American reality of today.  She straddles the distinctly European world with recognizable Russian and Jewish influences (mostly of Marc Chagall, whose first wife, Bella Chagall, frequently depicted as a flying female figure  in his early paintings, is Rozenman's great-aunt) and the uniquely American experience of freedom and thirst for deeper meaning of life interwoven with art. Today, Rozenman is a core member of the Fountain Street Gallery.

Paintings 

Over three decades, starting as a child artist, Rozenman went through several periods, capturing life experiences in images.  They reflect, on the one hand, her highly personal accounts of love, loss, and search for beauty, and on the other hand—the environments of  Russia, California, New York City, Boston, Midwest, and Europe.

In one of her recent series of paintings, called Transplanted, Rozenman superimposes her own images with iconic works of European and American artists, including Leonardo da Vinci, Breugel, Turner, Monet, Matisse and Diebenkorn.  This series, a part of which has been on display in Boston in 2013, represents the artist's search for a personal place in the story of the world art.

Graphics 

Rozenman started working on small graphics format in her teens, selling art from the sidewalks of Moscow busy Arbat Street thoroughfare.  She returned to this form recently, partly for the purposes of book illustration.

Book illustration 

Rozenman illustrated several books, including "Two Hands Clapping" a collaborative book of drawings with the British poet Grace Andreacchi (Andromache Books, London, 2009). Grace Andreacchi also published the video Two Hands Clapping on YouTube.

She has recently finished illustrating "Sticky Leaves" by Mikhail Epstein, a Russian-American literary theorist and critical thinker.

Art school 

Since 2012, Rozenman has been running a popular art school with classes for children and adults in Allston, and later in Somerville, Massachusetts, offering classes, seminars, and workshops in experimental and classical painting and drawing.

Principal solo exhibitions 
 2020 Furniture in Unexpected Places, Fountain Street Fine Arts, Boston (scheduled)
 2018 Looking Forward, Looking Back, Finn Gallery, Greenwich, Connecticut
 2017 Blind Dates, Hudson Gallery, Gloucester, Massachusetts
 2016 Broken Memories, J's Bodzin Gallery, Fairfax, Virginia
 2015 In Motion, Hammond Art Gallery, Fitchburg College, Fitchburg, Massachusetts
 2013 Multicultural Arts Center, East Cambridge, Massachusetts
 2011 Contemporary Art Network, New York, New York
 2011 French Cultural Center, Boston, Massachusetts
 2010 Newton Free Library Art Gallery, Newton, Massachusetts
 2009 The Ann Loeb Bronfman Gallery, Washington DC
 2008 Gallery 360, Minneapolis, Minneapolis
 2008 Village Quill, New York, New York
 2007 The Tychman -Shapiro Gallery, Minneapolis, Minnesota
 2007 Gallery 13, Minneapolis, Minnesota
 2006 Goetemann Gallery, Gloucester, Massachusetts
 2002–2006 Argyle Zebra Gallery, Saint Paul, Minnesota
 1998–2000 Clark Gallery, Lincoln, Massachusetts
 2001 Creole Gallery, Lansing, Michigan
 1999 University of Tennessee, Knoxville, Tennessee
 1998 New England School of Art and Design
 1996–1998 Kingston Gallery, Boston, Massachusetts
 1996 Tish Gallery at the Museum of Fine Arts, Boston, MFA Exhibition, Medford, Massachusetts

References

External links 

Alexandra Rozenman’s “Transplanted” at the Multicultural Arts Center
Alexandra Rozenman | deCordova 
Simple Scenes from Alexandra Rozenman
TWO HANDS CLAPPING
The Brooklyner

1971 births
American artists
American people of Russian descent
Living people